Taizhou High School, Jiangsu is a school in Taizhou, Jiangsu founded in 1902. It is one of the best high schools in Jiangsu and China, and ranks as top 100 high schools in China

Hu Jintao, the former General Secretary of the Chinese Communist Party, graduated from Taizhou High School in 1959, before continuing his studies at Tsinghua University.

References 

1902 establishments in China
Educational institutions established in 1902
High schools in Jiangsu
Taizhou, Jiangsu